The Aletschhorn is a mountain in the Alps in Switzerland, lying within the Jungfrau-Aletsch region, which has been designated a World Heritage Site by UNESCO. The mountain shares part of its name with the Aletsch Glacier lying at its foot.

The Aletschhorn, the second highest mountain of the Bernese Alps after the Finsteraarhorn, is the only one of the higher peaks that lies completely in Valais. It is the culminating point of a chain running parallel with the dividing ridge, and surpassing it in the height of its principal peaks. Standing thus between the principal range of the Bernese Alps and the Pennine chain, it shares with the Bietschhorn the advantage of occupying a central position in relation to the high peaks around it. The Aletschhorn is often thought to command the finest of all the panoramic views from Alpine summits.

Geography 

On its northern flank lies the Aletschfirn, which is part of the Aletsch Glacier. On the southwest lies the Oberaletsch Glacier and, on the southeast, lies the Mittelaletsch Glacier. Both are in the catchment area of the Massa river, which originates in the Aletsch Glacier and ends up in the Rhone river. Its remote location in the middle of glaciers means that the Aletschhorn, despite its height, is less frequently visited and less well known than the summits of the Jungfrau and the Eiger, which lie about 10 km on the north.

Climbing history 

The Aletschhorn was first climbed almost 50 years after the first ascent of the Jungfrau. When the Jungfrau was first climbed, the climbers used base camps on the Aletschfirn, at the foot of the Aletschhorn.

The Aletschhorn was climbed first in 1859 by Francis Fox Tuckett, J. J. Bennen, V. Tairraz and P. Bohren. The party passed the night in some holes in the rocks above the Mittel Aletsch Glacier (on the east side of the mountain), and on the following morning, on 18 June, started the ascent and reached the snow arête connecting the Dreieckhorn with the main peak. The passage along this arête at a so early period of the year, before the snow has become well consolidated, involved some risk and a slope of névé lying at an angle of 50°, required care and good step-cutting. But the summit could be reached without too much difficulty. Like many other climbers, Tuckett took with him a barometer and made scientific observations. He noted the icy temperature and the very strong wind, blowing the snow and threatening to knock over the climbers.

After they reached the summit, Tuckett separated from Bennen and descended via the north face with Bohren and Tairraz. He wanted to descend directly to the Lötschental, but soon after they began the descent, an avalanche started right under the feet of the climbers. They cautiously went back and descended on the Mittelaletsch.

Climbing routes 
Northeast ridge  	 
 Difficulty: PD+
 Starting point: Mittelaletschbiwak (3,013 m)
 Valley: Fiesch (1,049 m)

Southwest ridge
 Difficulty: AD, II
 Starting point: Oberaletschhütte (2,640 m)
 Valley: Blatten bei Naters (1,322 m)

See also

List of 4000 metre peaks of the Alps

References

 This article is based on a translation of the corresponding article from the German Wikipedia, accessed on various occasions during April 2005.

External links
 Aletschhorn on Summitpost
 Photo Aletschhorn from Lötschenlücke 
 Photo Aletschhorn from Mischabelhuts

Alpine four-thousanders
Bernese Alps
Mountains of the Alps
Mountains of Valais
Mountains of Switzerland
Four-thousanders of Switzerland